The Little Betsy River is a  stream on the Upper Peninsula of Michigan in the United States. It is a tributary of Lake Superior.

See also
List of rivers of Michigan

References

Michigan  Streamflow Data from the USGS

Rivers of Michigan
Tributaries of Lake Superior